Footfall is a 1985 science fiction novel.

Footfall or footfalls can also refer to:

Additional titled works
Footfalls, 1975 play by Samuel Beckett
Footfalls (film), a lost 1921 American silent film

Metaphorical usages evoking counting of individual presences
Experian FootFall, a United Kingdom market research company
The number of people who enter a shop or business in a particular period of time; see People counter – Business metrics

Other
 Gait, that is, the pattern of coordinated motion of limbs (or analogous entities) in moving them (or analogous members), including transitional maneuvers that effect transitions between such patterns